Ottoman Turkish may refer to:

 Ottoman Turkish, the language used by Ottoman Turks, the Turkic ethnic group in the Ottoman Turkey
 Ottoman Turkey (Ottoman Empire)
 Ottoman Turks

Language and nationality disambiguation pages